Cassius Clay (soon Muhammad Ali) fought Jim Robinson in a boxing match at Miami Beach Convention Center on February 7, 1961. Clay won the fight through a technical knockout when the referee stopped the fight in the first round. Robinson was a last minute replacement for another fighter who was supposed to fight Clay on the night of the fight; this was Robinson's second professional boxing match.

References

Robinson
1961 in boxing
February 1961 sports events in the United States
1961 in sports in Florida